Kaden Wade Honeycutt (born June 23, 2003) is an American professional stock car racing driver. He competes part-time in the NASCAR Craftsman Truck Series, driving the No. 04 Ford F-150 for Roper Racing. He also competes full-time in the CARS Late Model Stock Tour, driving the No. 12 Chevrolet for Nelson Motorsports, part-time in various 602 Crate Dirt Late Model series, driving the No. 10 Longhorn Chassis for Kaden Honeycutt Racing, and full-time in the eNASCAR Coca-Cola iRacing Series, driving the No. 17 Ford Mustang for RFK Racing.

Racing career

CARS Tour
Honeycutt began competing in the CARS Tour in 2021, where he ran all 13 late model stock tour races. He finished 2nd in the points standings with two wins, seven top-5s, 12 top-10s, earning CARS Late Model Stock Tour Rookie of the Year honors.

eNASCAR Coca-Cola iRacing Series
Honeycutt, along with Parker Retzlaff, were announced as the drivers for RFK Racing's team in the eNASCAR Coca-Cola iRacing Series in 2022.

ARCA Menards Series
Honeycutt drove part-time in the ARCA Menards Series for Empire Racing in 2018 and his own team in 2019.

NASCAR Craftsman Truck Series
Honeycutt planned on making his NASCAR Camping World Truck Series debut in October 2019 driving for his own team that he fielded in ARCA that year. However, that did not end up happening.

Honeycutt would not make his debut in the Truck Series until 2022 when he drove the No. 46 for G2G Racing in the race at Martinsville. On June 16, 2022, G2G announced that Honeycutt would return to drive for the team in the races at Nashville (in the No. 47), Richmond and Kansas in September. It was later announced on July 14, 2022 that Honeycutt had signed a three race deal with On Point Motorsports to drive the No. 30 truck for the team in the races at Pocono, Richmond, and Kansas races. Honeycutt's breakthrough moment would be at Bristol, in which he finished in the top-15.

On January 31, 2023, Roper Racing announced that Honeycutt would drive their No. 04 truck in the first six races of the Truck Series season.

Motorsports career results

NASCAR
(key) (Bold – Pole position awarded by qualifying time. Italics – Pole position earned by points standings or practice time. * – Most laps led.)

Craftsman Truck Series

 Season still in progress
 Ineligible for series points

ARCA Menards Series
(key) (Bold – Pole position awarded by qualifying time. Italics – Pole position earned by points standings or practice time. * – Most laps led.)

References

External links
 
 

2003 births
NASCAR drivers
Living people
ARCA Menards Series drivers
People from Parker County, Texas
Racing drivers from Texas